Vincent LeRay House, also known as The Stone House, is a historic home located at Cape Vincent in Jefferson County, New York. It is located within the boundaries of the Broadway Historic District.

Construction and Physical Properties 
The home was built in 1815 by James D. LeRay for his son, Vincent. The home is a -story, five-by-four-bay stone building. Also on the property is a limestone boathouse, a 2-story stucco cottage, and board and batten garage.

Historical Significance 
Vincent left the house vacant when he moved into his father's mansion in LeRaysville. In 1873, Vincent sold the house to the Peugnet family. The home remained in their possession until the 20th century. The home was later listed on the National Register of Historic Places on November 15, 1973.

References

Houses on the National Register of Historic Places in New York (state)
Houses in Jefferson County, New York
National Register of Historic Places in Jefferson County, New York